The second season of the American television sitcom New Girl premiered on Fox on September 25, 2012, and concluded on May 14, 2013, consisting of 25 episodes. Developed by Elizabeth Meriwether under the working title Chicks & Dicks, the series revolves around offbeat teacher Jess (Zooey Deschanel) after her moving into a Los Angeles loft with three men, Nick (Jake Johnson), Schmidt (Max Greenfield), and Winston (Lamorne Morris); Jess's best friend Cece (Hannah Simone) also appears regularly. The show combines comedy and drama elements as the characters, who are in their early thirties, deal with maturing relationships and career choices.

Production
On April 9, 2012, Fox renewed New Girl for a second season, which premiered on September 25, 2012. Parker Posey guest starred as a "shot girl" at a party thrown by Schmidt in the season premiere episode "Re-Launch"; Leslie Mann was originally cast in the role, but pulled out due to a scheduling conflict. Raymond J. Barry guest starred as "Old Nick" — an older drunk man who frequents Nick's bar, claiming to be Nick — from the future. Niecy Nash, David Walton and Eric Winter all signed on as guest stars for the second season. However, Walton was the only actor out of three that appeared in the series, he appeared in a recurring role as Jess' love interest, Sam, first appearing in the episode "Katie". Rachael Harris reprised her role as Jess' boss, Tanya Lamontagne in episode "Re-Launch". Maria Thayer guest starred as Amelia in the Halloween episode, a woman from Nick's college days. Carla Gugino guest starred in a three-episode stint as Schmidt's new boss, Emma. Jamie Lee Curtis and Rob Reiner guest starred as Jess' parents in the Thanksgiving episode. Rob Riggle also guest starred as Schmidt's cousin in the Thanksgiving episode. Olivia Munn guest starred in a three-episode arc as Angie, a love interest for Nick. Brenda Song appeared in a recurring role as Daisy, a love interest for Winston. Brooklyn Decker also guest starred in Song's introductory episode, appearing as Holly. Nate Corddry also guest starred in an episode. Odette Annable guest starred as Nick's new boss and love interest, Shane, in the episode "Quick Hardening Caulk"; It was previously reported that Annable's role would be recurring, however, she only appeared in one episode. Margo Martindale, Nick Kroll and Bill Burr guest starred as Nick's mother, brother and cousin, respectively. Dermot Mulroney reprised his role as Russell from the previous season. Merritt Wever played Elizabeth, Schmidt's old girlfriend from college, in the last four episodes of the season. Taylor Swift guest starred in the season finale "Elaine's Big Day", playing the episode's titular character.

Cast and characters

Main cast
 Zooey Deschanel as Jessica "Jess" Day
 Jake Johnson as Nick Miller
 Max Greenfield as Schmidt
 Lamorne Morris as Winston Bishop
 Hannah Simone as Cece

Recurring cast
Rachael Harris as Tanya Lamontagne
Kali Hawk as Shelby
Dermot Mulroney as Russell
Nelson Franklin as Robby
David Walton as Sam
Carla Gugino as Emma
Rob Reiner as Bob Day
Olivia Munn as Angie
Brenda Song as Daisy
Satya Bhabha as Shivrang
Merritt Weaver as Elizabeth

Guest cast

Episodes

Reception
On review aggregator website Rotten Tomatoes, the season holds an approval rating of 88% based on 16 reviews, with an average rating of 6.56/10.
The site's critical consensus reads, "New Girls terrific ensemble cast remains its most valuable asset, and the show is buoyed by a deeper, more relatable central performance from lead Zooey Deschanel in its sophomore season."

References

External links

 
 

New Girl
2012 American television seasons
2013 American television seasons